The 2020 Copa Bicentenario was a planned tournament with the participation of the 20 teams of the Liga 1, and 10 teams of the Liga 2. The champions would have been entitled to qualify for the 2021 Copa Sudamericana, as well as the Supercopa Peruana against the Liga 1 champions. Atlético Grau are the defending champions.

The tournament was cancelled due to the COVID-19 pandemic.

Teams

Stadia and locations

See also
 2020 Torneo de Promoción y Reserva
 2020 Liga 2
 2020 Copa Perú

Notes

References

External links
Official website 
Torneo Descentralizado news at Peru.com 
Torneo Descentralizado statistics and news at Dechalaca.com 

2019
2020 in Peruvian football
Copa Bicentenario